Kerikeri Airport , also known as Bay of Islands Airport, is an airport at Kerikeri, New Zealand.  It is about a three-hour drive from Auckland and a 45-minute flight from Auckland Airport.

History
The airport was initially a grass airstrip created in the early 1930s or possibly earlier. During World War II the airport was taken over by the Defence Department for Royal New Zealand Air Force training. After the war ended it was once again run by local government.

In 1972, Mount Cook Airlines decided to use the airport to connect to tourist resorts. The service failed through lack of patronage. A Kerikeri-Auckland route was started by the airline but was not widely used. It was not until 1992, after the transfer of the airport to Northern Airports Corporation (now merged into Far North Holdings Ltd), that Eagle Airways (a subsidiary of Air New Zealand) took over scheduled service and patronage on the route increased. Eagle Airways ceased its Kerikeri service in 2015 and was replaced by another Air New Zealand Link subsidiary, Air Nelson, operating a 50-seat  Bombardier Dash 8 Q300.

In 2008, Salt Air began twice daily flights to North Shore Aerodrome in Auckland with a Cessna Caravan, utilising the Northern Busway to transport passengers to the city centre traffic free. That same year the airline began tours to a private airfield near Cape Reinga from Kerikeri with a Gippsland GA8 Airvan. The North Shore service was sold to Flight Hauraki (now Air Auckland) in 2012, before being dropped in February 2013 by the airline, less than three months after it was taken over.

Salt Air operates Cape Reinga tours and uses Kerikeri for fixed wing operations with its sole Gippsland GA8.

The runway was extended in 2014–15 and the apron area was strengthened and expanded to allow more aircraft to park. This was paid for by Air New Zealand. In October 2016 it was announced the terminal would be expanded due to an increase in passenger numbers with a record 87,000 in 2015, an increase of 33 percent since Dash 8 began servicing the Auckland-Kerikeri route.

The government announced on 16 March 2018 that the airport required a new terminal to meet demand; it was one of the fastest-growing regional airports in the country handling a record 110,000 passengers in the 2017/2018 financial year. The existing terminal was not fit for purpose and did not meet Air New Zealand's requirements, while growth in passenger numbers also put pressure on the existing facilities. The new $4.75 million terminal opened on 16 June 2019 with improved arrivals and departures, baggage screening and luggage collection facilities.  $1.75 million of the funding came from the government's annual $1 billion provincial growth fund, announced by the Regional economic development minister Shane Jones.

Light aircraft transit 
Kerikeri Airport is used by light aircraft arriving or departing from New Zealand. Norfolk Island Airport is 903 km (488 nautical miles) north-west of Kerikeri, 754 km (407 nautical miles) to Nouméa in New Caledonia, or 900 km (486 nautical miles) to Lord Howe Island which can be used as a stepping stone to the Australian mainland.

These distances are within the range of many light aircraft when fitted with long range tanks, while the direct distance without using Norfolk Island as a stepping stone is usually beyond their capabilities.  From New Caledonia other Pacific Islands such as Vanuatu and Fiji are within range and can be used as further 'stepping stones' to the other South Pacific and North Pacific destinations. Kaitaia Airport also has fuel available and is 52 km (28 nautical miles) closer to Norfolk Island than Kerikeri.

Airlines and destinations

Alongside scheduled operators, Kerikeri Airport is also home to a skydive operator and the Bay of Islands Aero Club, both situated alongside the south-eastern grass runway.

See also

 List of airports in New Zealand
 List of airlines of New Zealand
 Transport in New Zealand

References

External links
Kerikeri Airport

Airports in New Zealand
Far North District
Transport in the Northland Region
Bay of Islands
Transport buildings and structures in the Northland Region